Architype van der Leck is a geometric sans-serif typeface, based upon the 1941 typeface designed by Bart van der Leck for the Dutch magazine Flax, a journal of the De Stijl art movement.

The face is geometrically constructed, and based upon an earlier stencil lettering alphabet van der Leck designed in the early 1930s for use in  branding and advertising Jo de Leeuw's prestigious Dutch department stores Metz & Co. The face shares structural similarities with Theo van Doesburg's 1919 geometric alphabet, and anticipates later typographic explorations of geometric reductionism of Wim Crouwel's 1967 New Alphabet and early digital faces like Zuzana Licko's faces Lo-Res and Emperor 8. The Architype van der Leck typeface is part of a collection of several revivals of early twentieth century typographic experimentation designed by Freda Sack and David Quay of The Foundry.

See also
Architype Albers
Architype Aubette
Architype Bayer 
Architype Renner
Architype Schwitters

References
Blackwell, Lewis. 20th Century Type. Yale University Press: 2004. .
Haley, Allen. Type: Hot Designers Make Cool Fonts. Rockport Publishers Inc, Gloucester; 1998. 
Hoek, Els, Marleen Blokhuis, Ingrid Goovaerts, Natalie Kamphuys, et al. Theo van Doesburg: Oeuvre Catalogus. Centraal Museum: 2000. .
Meggs, Philip. B and McKelvey, Roy. Revival of the Fittest: Digital Versions of Classic Typefaces. RC Publications; 2002.

External links
Architype 1 types
Website for The Foundry
Website of Emotional Digital describing work by The Foundry

Geometric sans-serif typefaces